Wilson, West Virginia may refer to the following places in West Virginia:
Wilson, Cabell County, West Virginia, an unincorporated community
Wilson, Kanawha County, West Virginia, an unincorporated community
Wilson, Maryland and West Virginia, an unincorporated community in Grant County